Palmério Dória (born 1948, in Santarém) is a Brazilian journalist and writer, ex-director of Sexy magazine and author of a number of books.

Dória was born in Santarém and raised in Belém by a priest. He moved to the South of Brazil and started working as a journalist, working at press vehicles such as Folha de S.Paulo, O Estado de S. Paulo and Caros Amigos magazine. He was chief-of-reportage of Rede Globo until 1992, when he took over Sexy magazine.

Books 
Dória published, among others, the following books:
 Mataram o Presidente – Memórias do pistoleiro que mudou a História do Brasil (1976; translates as "They Killed the President – Memoirs of the gunman who changed the history of Brazil), which deals with the historical moment started with Getúlio Vargas suicide;
 A Guerrilha do Araguaia (1978; translates as "Araguaia Guerrilla"), a report on the communist reaction quelled by the Brazilian military dictatorship.
 Evasão de Privacidade (2001; translates as "Evasion of Privacy"), which compiles a number of interviews with famous women published on Sexy magazine.
 A candidata que virou picolé (2002; translates as "The candidate that turned into ice pop"), which reports the brief candidacy of Roseana Sarney for president.
 Honoráveis Bandidos ─ Um Retrato do Brasil na Era Sarney (2009; translates as Honorable Criminals – A picture of Brazil during Sarney Era), about the power of the Sarney family on the Brazilian state of Maranhão.
 O Príncipe da Privataria – a história secreta de como o Brasil perdeu seu patrimônio e Fernando Henrique Cardoso ganhou sua reeleição (Geração Editorial, 2013; translates as "The Prince of Privatary – the secret history of how Brazil lost its patrimony and Fernando Henrique Cardoso won his reelection), about the FHC era.

References 

1948 births
Living people
Brazilian journalists
Brazilian non-fiction writers
People from Pará